Fionia may refer to:

 Fionia Bank Cup, a Danish football tournament
 Funen, the third-largest island of Denmark
 MS Fionia, a Danish ocean-going diesel motor ship, sister ship of MS Selandia
 Odense Stadium, a football stadium once called Fionia Park